Gonospira striaticosta a species of air-breathing land snail, terrestrial pulmonate gastropod mollusk in the family Streptaxidae. 

This species is endemic to Mauritius.

References

 Griffiths, O.L. & Florens, V.F.B. (2006). A field guide to the non-marine molluscs of the Mascarene Islands (Mauritius, Rodrigues and Réunion) and the northern dependencies of Mauritius. Bioculture Press: Mauritius. Pp. i–xv, 1–185.

Gonospira
Gastropods described in 1866
Taxonomy articles created by Polbot
Endemic fauna of Mauritius
Taxobox binomials not recognized by IUCN